Alimentus may refer to:

Lucius Cincius Alimentus, annalist in the time of the Second Punic War
Marcus Cincius Alimentus, the tribune who originated the Lex Cincia